The Ribalow Prize is a literary prize awarded annually by Hadassah Magazine the best work of fiction in English on a Jewish theme.

The prize, formally the Harold U. Ribalow Prize, was endowed in memory of Harold U. Ribalow, an American writer, editor, and anthologist.

The inaugural prize was given in 1983 to Chaim Grade for the short story collection Rabbis and Wives.  The stories, first published in Yiddish, were translated into English and published by Knopf in 1982.

References

Awards established in 1983
Jewish literary awards
1983 establishments in the United States
Literary awards by magazines and newspapers
Hadassah Women's Zionist Organization of America